"She Even Woke Me Up to Say Goodbye" is a song written by Doug Gilmore and Mickey Newbury, and recorded by American country music artist Jerry Lee Lewis. Released in September 1969, it was the first single from his album She Even Woke Me Up to Say Goodbye. The song peaked at number 2 on the Billboard Hot Country Singles chart. It also reached number 1 on the RPM Country Tracks chart in Canada.

Newbury's recording of the song was included on his 1969 album Looks Like Rain. Kenny Rogers and The First Edition also recorded the track on their best-selling album Something's Burning.

A cover by Ronnie Milsap peaked at number 15 on the Billboard Hot Country Singles chart in 1975.

Chart performance

Jerry Lee Lewis

Ronnie Milsap

References

1969 singles
1975 singles
Jerry Lee Lewis songs
Ronnie Milsap songs
Songs written by Mickey Newbury
1969 songs
Smash Records singles
American country music
American country music songs
Song recordings produced by Jerry Kennedy